Adhi Kot is a meteorite that fell on 1 May 1919 in the Punjab region, now in Pakistan.

History

Classification
It was classified as an enstatite chondrite type EH4.

See also
Glossary of meteoritics
Meteorite fall

References

Further reading

Meteorites found in Pakistan
1919 in British India